Shahrak-e Shahid Kashvari (also Romanized as Shahrak-e Shahīd Kashvarī) is a village in Keshvari Rural District, in the Central District of Ilam County, Ilam Province, Iran. At the 2006 census, its population was 3,749, in 819 families. It is the capital village of the Rural district which was established on March 9, 2013. The village is populated by Kurds.

References 

Populated places in Ilam County
Kurdish settlements in Ilam Province